Kalifa McCollin (born 18 July 1995) is a netball player from Trinidad and Tobago, who plays for the Collingwood Magpies in the Suncorp Super Netball league.

Career
McCollin's netball career commenced from a young age. Born in Trinidad and Tobago to sports-coaching parents, she was selected to play for the under-16 international team at the age of 12, and rose up the international ranks to make her senior debut for the national team in 2015, at the age of 17. She has represented Trinidad and Tobago at the 2015 and 2019 Netball World Cups. 

In club netball, McCollin's ability led to her moving to the United Kingdom, where she played for the Celtic Dragons and Mavericks between 2016 and 2019, and became one of the Netball Superleague's most reliable attackers. In 2020 she moved to New Zealand to play in the ANZ Premiership for the Southern Steel, and in 2021 she was signed by Australian Super Netball team the Collingwood Magpies.

References

Living people
1995 births
Trinidad and Tobago netball players
Celtic Dragons players
Mavericks netball players
Netball Superleague players
Southern Steel players
ANZ Premiership players
Collingwood Magpies Netball players
Suncorp Super Netball players
2019 Netball World Cup players
Trinidad and Tobago expatriate sportspeople in Australia
Trinidad and Tobago expatriate sportspeople in England
2015 Netball World Cup players